Frank Ursomarso (born September 19, 1942) is an American political strategist who served as White House Communications Director in 1981.

Frank Ursomarso has spent his career in politics and the automotive industry.

Currently he is Chairman of Union Park Automotive Group, a franchised automotive dealership for BMW, Volvo, Honda, Buick GMC and Jaguar brands. It has been in business and family-owned for three generations.

Frank is a member of the Delaware Automobile and Truck Dealers Association. Also he served on the Industry Relations and Communications Committees during his tenure on the Board of Directors at NADA.

Frank is a member of the Gerald R. Ford Presidential Foundation.

Frank’s political career began in 1973 to 1976, when he served as staff assistant to President Gerald R. Ford, and then in 1981  when he was deputy assistant and director of communications to President Ronald Reagan.  He was walking beside President Ford in Sacramento California, when an attempt was made to shoot President Ford.

Additionally, Frank’s experience with communications includes having been Television Production Coordinator for the 1976 and 1980 Presidential Debates.  He served as a member of the Pennsylvania Public Television Network, the Pennsylvania Securities Commission, the Pennsylvania Horse Racing Commission, and was Chairman of the Pennsylvania Turnpike Commission. 

During his service in the U.S. Army as a military police officer, he was a member of the task force on domestic disturbances.  His unit, the 503d Military Police Battalion was deployed to the Pentagon for the March on the Pentagon. He served one year in Vietnam and was awarded the Bronze Star Medal.

Frank earned a J.D. degree from UCLA in 1967 and a B.A. degree from Gettysburg College in 1964.

He is married to the former Catherine Sanders and lives in Wilmington, Delaware. He has three sons and three grandchildren.

References

|-

1942 births
Living people
Gettysburg College alumni
UCLA School of Law alumni
White House Communications Directors
Reagan administration personnel
Delaware Republicans